The FIBA Oceania Championship for Women 1982 was the qualifying tournament of FIBA Oceania for the 1983 FIBA World Championship for Women. Australia won the series 3–0.

Results

References

FIBA Oceania Championship for Women
Championship
1982 in New Zealand basketball
1982 in Australian basketball
International basketball competitions hosted by Australia
Australia women's national basketball team games
New Zealand women's national basketball team games
1982 in Australian women's sport
October 1982 sports events in Australia